Xingkong may refer to:

Xing Kong, Mandarin-language television channel based in Hong Kong
Xingkong (camouflage), military camouflage pattern adopted by China's People's Liberation Army
Sky (Malaysian TV series), 2007 series
Starry Starry Night (film), 2011 Taiwanese film